John MacGilchrist (July 12, 1893 – May 1977) was an American painter. His work was part of the painting event in the art competition at the 1932 Summer Olympics.

References

1893 births
1977 deaths
20th-century American painters
American male painters
Olympic competitors in art competitions
People from Stirling
20th-century American male artists
British emigrants to the United States